Malostranské humoresky is a 1995 Czech film that starred Josef Kemr.

References

External links
 

1995 films
Czech comedy-drama films
1990s Czech-language films